This article lists school shootings in the United States by death toll (four or more deaths, including any perpetrators that died during the shooting).

List

This table is organized first by deaths, then injuries, and then dates.

See also 
 List of mass shootings in the United States
 List of school shootings in the United States (before 2000)
 List of school shootings in the United States (2000–present)
 List of school-related attacks

Notes

References

School shootings by death toll
United States